Delta Work is the stage name of Gabriel A. Villarreal, a Mexican-American drag performer and stylist, best known for competing on the third season of the reality competition television series RuPaul's Drag Race.

Villarreal received the Primetime Emmy Award for Outstanding Hairstyling for a Multi-Camera Series or Special at the 70th Primetime Creative Arts Emmy Awards (2018) for his work as a personal hairstylist for Drag Race.

She currently co-hosts the podcast Very That, alongside Raja.

Career 
Villarreal's drag mother is Miss Coco Peru; they met in Los Angeles, early in Delta Work's drag career. He started drag on Halloween at age 22. Her drag name originates from when she attended a drag show and the performing group of queens, who were making a spoof of Designing Women, needed a "bigger woman" to play the role of Delta Burke's character Suzanne Sugarbaker. After her performance, one queen commented that "you are not Delta Burke, you are Delta Work!"

Drag Race 
Work was selected among thirteen contestants for the third season of RuPaul's Drag Race, which was announced on January 24, 2011. During the season, she impersonated Cher for the "Snatch Game" episode, where contestants were required to imitate a chosen celebrity. Bowen Yang wrote "Delta barely made an attempt at all... Points for the wink at Bob Mackie with her look, but otherwise Delta just waded around in her nothing-doing. Snap out of it!" She placed seventh overall, losing a lip sync performance to Manila Luzon on Donna Summer's "MacArthur Park". Out called the battle "certainly one of the most famous lip syncs" of the show. Outside of season three, she was an audience member for the season five and season six reunions, and was a guest with other Drag Race alumni for the first challenge of season ten. Villarreal became RuPaul's personal wig stylist for her judging panel attire beginning with the second episode of the ninth season, with season two alumnus Raven styling her makeup. Work appeared as a guest for the first challenge in the premiere of season eleven.

Post Drag Race 
Villarreal appeared on a 2011 episode of E!'s The Soup with RuPaul, Raja, and Shangela. She makes recurring appearances on WoWPresent's internet show Fashion Photo Ruview, filling in for Raja or Raven to critique looks from Drag Race alumni, with his first appearance on November 19, 2014. She also makes regular appearances on the web show The Pit Stop, which reviews the episodes of Drag Race. She was on its debut episode on August 27, 2016.

Work appeared on the cover of Skorch Magazine in 2013. In August 2015, she headlined Palouse Pride in Moscow, Idaho. On August 6, 2016, she was invited on stage by Adele in a Los Angeles concert, while in full drag as an Adele impersonator. They took a selfie, which quickly went viral.

Villarreal received the Primetime Emmy Award for Outstanding Hairstyling for a Multi-Camera Series or Special at the 70th Primetime Creative Arts Emmy Awards (2018) for her work. She portrayed Adele in the music video for Taylor Swift's "You Need to Calm Down" (June 2019).

In September 2020 Work began co-hosting the ongoing conversational podcast Very That on the Forever Dog and Moguls of Media networks, alongside her RuPaul's Drag Race season three castmate Raja, where the duo discuss recent news and answer questions from fans. The podcast's executive producers include fellow RuPaul's Drag Race alumni Alaska Thunderfuck and Willam Belli.

Music 
Delta Work released her debut single, "The Walkin' Blues (Walk Right In, Walk Right Out)", on May 12, 2015. She also was part of the group The Heathers, with Manila Luzon, Raja, and Carmen Carrera. The group released their debut single "Lady Marmalade" on June 6, 2014.

Personal life 
Villarreal lives in Norwalk, California, as of 2011.

Filmography

Television

Music videos

Web series

Podcasts

Discography

Singles

References

External links 
 

Living people
American drag queens
American hairdressers
Primetime Emmy Award winners
Delta Work
Hispanic and Latino American drag queens
1976 births